Woodbury is a rural locality in the local government area (LGA) of Southern Midlands in the Central LGA region of the island state of Tasmania, Australia. The 2016 census recorded a population of 27 for the state suburb of Woodbury.

History 
Woodbury was gazetted as a locality in 1974.

Geography
Many of the boundaries of the locality consist of survey lines. The North-South Railway Line passes through the centre of the locality.

Road infrastructure 
National Route 1 (Midland Highway) passes through from south to north.

References

Towns in Tasmania
Localities of Southern Midlands Council